The ninth season of Teenage Mutant Ninja Turtles aired in 1995. With the turtles' usual enemies Shredder and Krang stuck in Dimension X with no way out following the destruction of the Technodrome, a new villain, Lord Dregg takes their place as the main villain of the series. The Technodrome is not seen in this season. This is also the last season with David Wise's input.

Episodes
 All eight ninth-season episodes were directed by Tony Love.

References

External links
TV Com

Teenage Mutant Ninja Turtles (1987 TV series) seasons
1995 American television seasons